Dongbao District is a district of the city of Jingmen, Hubei, People's Republic of China.

History
Dongbao District was established in 1985. 'Dongbao' refers to the 'Dongshan Baota' Pagoda established in the Sui Dynasty. On March 17, 2001, Hechang Township, Macheng Town, Tuanlinpu Town, Duodaoshi Subdistrict and Baimiao Subdistrict were made into Duodao District.

Administrative divisions
Two subdistricts:
Longquan Subdistrict, Quankou Subdistrict

Six towns:
Lixi, Ziling, Zhanghe, Mahe, Shiqiaoyi, Pailou

The only township is Xianju Township

References

County-level divisions of Hubei
Jingmen